was a Japanese actor, voice actor and narrator from Ikeda, Osaka. He was previously affiliated with Tokyo Actor's Consumer's Cooperative Society, and was affiliated with Aoni Production at the time of his death.

Career
Nagai played GeGeGe no Kitaro's Konaki Jijii, a comic, absent-minded old yōkai man who attacks enemies by clinging to them and turning himself to stone, increasing his weight and mass immensely and pinning them down between the 60s and 80s alongside Masako Nozawa and Keiko Toda (Kitaro), Isamu Tanonaka (Medama oyaji), Chikao Ohtsuka and Kei Tomiyama (Nezumi-Otoko), Nana Yamaguchi, Yuko Mita (Neko Musume), Yoko Ogushi, Keiko Yamamoto (Sunakake Baba), Yonehiko Kitagawa, Kenji Utsumi and Yusaku Yara (Nurikabe) and Jōji Yanami, Keaton Yamada and Kōsei Tomita (Ittan Momen).

Nagai was cast as Sazae-san's character, Namihei Isono, Sazae's father and patriarch of the family in the longest running Anime in 1969 alongside co-stars Midori Katō (Sazae) and Miyoko Asō (Fune) until Chafurin filled in for him after his death.

He was cast in Urusei Yatsura as the wandering monk Cherry in 1983 alongside co-stars Toshio Furukawa (Ataru Moroboshi), Saeko Shimazu (Shinobu Miyake), Fumi Hirano (Lum) and Akira Kamiya (Shutaro Mendo).

He was cast in 1989 until 2008 in Ranma ½ as Happosai, the founder and grandmaster of Musabetsu Kakutō Ryū. He often alternates between his role as a villainous grandmaster to one as a lighthearted pervert, alongside co-stars Kappei Yamaguchi and Megumi Hayashibara (Ranma Saotome), Kenichi Ogata (Genma), Masako Ikeda (Nodoka), Noriko Hidaka (Akane Tendo), Aso (Cologne), Hirotaka Suzuoki and Kōji Tsujitani (Tatewaki Kuno), Kōichi Yamadera (Ryoga Hibiki) and Hiromi Tsuru (Ukyo Kuonji).

Death
On January 27, 2014, while recording narration for a program in Hiroshima, Nagai suffered a bout of myocardial infarction and was found by a hotel employee. He was rushed to a hospital, where he was pronounced dead; Nagai was 82 years old at the time of his death.

Filmography

Television animation

OVA

Theatrical animation

Video games

Dragon Ball: Origins (Karin)
Dragon Ball: Revenge of King Piccolo (Karin)
Dragon Ball Z: Budokai 3 (Karin)
Dragon Ball Z: Sparking! Meteor (Korin)
Dragon Ball Z: Sparking! Neo (Korin)
Hunter × Hunter: Wonder Adventure (Isaac Netero)
Jak and Daxter: The Precursor Legacy (Samos the Sage)
Jak II (Samos the Sage)
Kingdom Hearts II (Philoctetes)
Kingdom Hearts Birth by Sleep (Philoctetes, Grumpy)
Kingdom Hearts HD 1.5 Remix (Philoctetes (Phil))
Lego Star Wars: The Complete Saga (Yoda)
Phantasy Star Portable (Lucaim Nav)
Phantasy Star Universe (Lucaim Nav)
Tomba! 2: The Evil Swine Return (Kainen)

Tokusatsu
Himitsu Sentai Gorenger (Baseball Mask)
J.A.K.Q. Dengekitai (Devil Batter)
Juken Sentai Gekiranger (Master Xia Fu)
Kaizoku Sentai Gokaiger (Master Xia Fu)
Kaizoku Sentai Gokaiger the Movie: The Flying Ghost Ship (Baseball Mask)
Kamen Rider G (Narrator)

Dubbing

Live action
Michael Gambon
Harry Potter and the Philosopher's Stone – Albus Dumbledore
Harry Potter and the Prisoner of Azkaban – Albus Dumbledore
Harry Potter and the Goblet of Fire – Albus Dumbledore
Harry Potter and the Order of the Phoenix – Albus Dumbledore
Harry Potter and the Half-Blood Prince – Albus Dumbledore
Harry Potter and the Deathly Hallows – Part 1 – Albus Dumbledore
Harry Potter and the Deathly Hallows – Part 2 – Albus Dumbledore
Frank Oz
The Empire Strikes Back (1980 Movie theater edition) – Yoda
The Muppet Christmas Carol - Fozzie Bear
Muppet Treasure Island - Fozzie Bear
Star Wars: Episode I – The Phantom Menace – Yoda 
Star Wars: Episode II – Attack of the Clones – Yoda 
Star Wars: Episode III – Revenge of the Sith – Yoda 
Walter Matthau
Dennis the Menace – George Wilson 
Charade (1994 NTV edition) – Carson Dyle
Grumpy Old Men – Max Goldman
The Odd Couple II – Oscar Madison 
Arthur and the Invisibles – Archibald (Ron Crawford)
Batteries Not Included – Frank Riley (Hume Cronyn)
Doctor Who – Charles Dickens (Simon Callow)
Ewoks: The Battle for Endor – Noa (Wilford Brimley)
The Fifth Element (2002 TV Asahi edition) – Father Vito Cornelius (Ian Holm)
Harry Potter and the Philosopher's Stone – Albus Dumbledore (Richard Harris)
Harry Potter and the Chamber of Secrets – Albus Dumbledore (Richard Harris)
The Holiday – Arthur Abbott (Eli Wallach)
Independence Day – Julius Levinson (Judd Hirsch)
Journey 2: The Mysterious Island – Alexander Anderson (Michael Caine)
Jurassic Park – John Hammond (Richard Attenborough)
The Lost World: Jurassic Park – John Hammond (Richard Attenborough)
L.A. Confidential – Sid Hudgens (Danny DeVito)
Lassie – The Duke of Rudling (Peter O'Toole)
Little Nicky – Mr. Beefy (Robert Smigel)
Mad Max Beyond Thunderdome (1988 Fuji TV edition) – Master (Angelo Rossitto)
The Muppet Movie – Rowlf the Dog
Night at the Museum – Gus (Mickey Rooney)
Rawhide – George Washington Wishbone (Paul Brinegar)
Scanners (1987 NTV edition) – Dr. Paul Ruth (Patrick McGoohan)
The Sound of Music – Max Detweiler (Richard Haydn)
The Sting – J.J. Singleton (Ray Walston)

Animation
The Black Cauldron – King Eidilleg
Galaxy High – Professor Icenstein
The Great Mouse Detective – Dr. Dawson
Hercules – Philoctetes
Home on the Range – Rusty
The Jetsons – Cosmo Spacely (first voice)
Lady and the Tramp – Toughy
Legend of the Guardians: The Owls of Ga'Hoole – Ezylryb
Looney Tunes series – Yosemite Sam (first voice)
Magic Adventures of Mumfie – Napoleon Jones
Star Wars: Clone Wars – Yoda
Star Wars: The Clone Wars (film) – Yoda
Star Wars: The Clone Wars (TV) – Yoda
Tintin and the Lake of Sharks – Thomson and Thompson
Tintin and the Temple of the Sun – Thomson and Thompson
Toy Story – Slinky Dog
Toy Story 2 – Slinky Dog
Toy Story 3 – Slinky Dog
Watership Down – Black Rabbit

References

External links
Official agency profile 

1931 births
2014 deaths
Japanese male stage actors
Japanese male video game actors
Japanese male voice actors
Kyoto University alumni
People from Ikeda, Osaka
Male voice actors from Osaka Prefecture
Tokyo Actor's Consumer's Cooperative Society voice actors
Aoni Production voice actors
20th-century Japanese male actors
21st-century Japanese male actors